Ceremonies in Dark Old Men is an American two act play by Lonne Elder III that premiered Off Broadway in 1969 at St. Mark's Playhouse in a production by the Negro Ensemble Company. Later in the 1969 season, it was given a commercial production that was a long-running success. It was the runner-up for the 1969 Pulitzer Prize in drama and was adapted for a television movie in 1975.

Characters 
 Russell B. Parker: A widower who runs a barbershop that has no customers and who lives upstairs with his daughter and two sons. Parker is not an ambitious man, but he is amiable and ordinarily honest, at least until he is talked into going along with Theo's schemes. He loves his children, and his attempts to recover his youth are touching.
 William Jenkins: Parker's friend and checkers opponent who finds himself drawn into the crooked dealings that Parker's sons undertake. He and Parker obviously feel deep affection for each other as they engage in badinage over their checkers games, which Jenkins always wins.
 Theopolis Parker: Russell Parker's older son, known as Theo. He teams up with Blue Haven to set up a bootlegging business but finds himself doing all the work while his father dips into the till. Theo is eager to run a con, and he has better judgment than his brother Bobby.
 Bobby Parker: Russell Parker's younger son, an expert burglar and shoplifter. As the second son, Bobby resents playing second fiddle to Theo, whose thoughtless insulting descriptions of Bobby probably help compel Bobby to perform reckless criminal acts under the spell of Blue Haven.
 Adele Eloise Parker: Parker's hardworking daughter, who supports the whole family with her office job. Adele is intelligent and conscientious, but she seems doomed to be used by men.
 Blue Haven: A tough man of the streets who knows how to get along and exploit weaker men such as Theo and Bobby. In his blue ensembles and dark glasses, carrying his gold- headed cane, he can become menacing.
 Young Girl: The unnamed pickup with whom Parker becomes infatuated. She is callous and exploitative, and she is a great disappointment to Parker.

Summary 
A floundering Harlem barbershop is the setting and the cauldron of action that leads to tragic consequences. Russell B Parker, a former vaudeville hoofer, is a man of big dreams but small ambitions. He hardly works at all in fact, often spending the time incessantly playing checkers with his friend, William Jenkins. Parker lives with Theopolis and Bobby, his two unemployed sons, and Adele, his hard-working daughter. The ghost of his dead wife, a woman who drove herself into an early grave working to support the family, nags at his conscience.

Adele deeply resents that she is carrying the entire family financially. She announces that she's done supporting her father's failing shop and freeloading brothers. If they do not find paying jobs immediately, she'll shutter the barbershop and kick them out on the street. Theo proposes they go into business selling "black lightning," his homemade corn whiskey, and convinces his father to meet Harlem crime boss Blue Haven. Blue gets them started and receives a cut of the profits in exchange for protection from police raids or rival criminals.

When the operation proves successful, Theo becomes the household's new breadwinner, but the family becomes divided. Adele blinds herself to their criminal activities through a romantic distraction. Bobby conspicuously spends time away from the shop and is rumored to be involved in a rash of city burglaries. And Parker often steals money from the operation's till, so he may entertain a Young Girl that has become the object of his affection.

While the family disintegrates and the retribution of Parker's choices threatens everything, he retreats into atmospheric tales of his life in vaudeville. In the final stages of the play, he even attempts to summon dance steps of his youth to little avail. Parker and his family's dreams of a better life cannot shake the spectre of a racist society, bringing their story to a tragic conclusion.

Themes 
The play concerns the ceremonies acted out by African American men. Parker is kept afloat by the fact that his daughter Adele works, which gives the family enough of an income to survive.  Jenkins, the other "Dark Old Man" of the title, finds a sanctuary in Parker's barbershop, where he trades insults with Parker and plays checkers. This part exemplifies the "ceremonies" of the title, the game. The barbershop provides a place where the two dark old men can be insulated from a society in which they have failed under the norms of the capitalist, racist society of the 1960s. According to the Oxford Companion to African American Literature:

The play is a dramatization of rituals—of survival, of friendship, of deception and manipulation, of self-deception, of black male friendship, of shifting intrafamilial allegiances, and of black manhood. As Elder presents the ineffectual lives of a Harlem family entrapped by rituals of economic and spiritual dependence, he urges African Americans and African American communities to become aware of and to break free of “ceremonies” that assuredly lead to personal loss and tragedy. Echoing Douglas Turner Ward's warning to black Americans whose “happiness” and survival are predicated upon white America's relationship to black America in Happy Ending (1966), Ceremonies challenges the myth that the social, political, and economic plight of black America rests in white people's hands. Through layers of ritual, Elder demonstrates the futility, corruption, and internal disruptions that result from efforts to undermine a capitalist system that seeks to determine and define African Americans’ worth and selfhood.

Production and reception 
The Negro Ensemble Company production of Ceremonies in Dark Old Men opened at the St. Mark's Playhouse, New York City, February 4 — March 9, 1969 (40 performances). Directed by Edmund Cambridge with the following cast:
 Douglas Turner — Mr. Russell B. Parker
 Arthur French — Mr. William Jenkins
 William Jay — Theopolis Parker
 David Downing — Bobby Parker
 Rosalind Cash — Adele Eloise Parker
 Samual Blue, Jr. — Blue Haven
 Judyann Elder — Young Girl

Ceremonies in Dark Old Men received positive reviews and tremendous praise. It was hailed by critic John Simon as “A phoenix too infrequent.”  Edith Oliver from The New Yorker stated in her review, “Ceremonies is the first play by Lonne Elder III to be done professionally, and if any American has written a finer one I can’t think what it is.” The play went on to garner nomination for the 1969 Pulitzer Prize in drama and is considered an America theatre classic.

Other versions
Ceremonies in Dark Old Men was staged two additional times Off-Broadway in the period of 1969 to 1985.
The Pocket Theatre, New York City, April 28, 1969 — February 15, 1970 (320 performances). Directed by Edmund Cambridge with the following cast:

 Richard Ward — Mr. Russell B. Parker
 Arnold Johnson — Mr. William Jenkins	
 Billy Dee Williams — Theopolis Parker
 Bette Howard — Adele Eloise Parker
 Richard Mason — Bobby Parker		
 Carl Lee — Blue Haven	
 Denise Nicholas — Young Girl	

Theatre Four, New York City, Negro Ensemble Company, May 15-June 30, 1985. (62 performances). Directed by Douglas Turner Ward with the following cast:

 Douglas Turner Ward — Mr. Russell B. Parker
 Graham Brown — Mr. William Jenkins	
 Ruben Santiago-Hudson — Theopolis Parker
 Patty Holley — Adele Eloise Parker
 Walter Allen Bennett Jr. — Bobby Parker		
 Keith David — Blue Haven	
 Tracy Camila Johns — Young Girl

Beverly Canon Theater, Los Angeles, Crossroads Theatre, February 5 - March 20, 1988. Directed by Judyann Elder with the following cast:

Edmund Cambridge — Mr. Russell B. Parker
Teddy Wilson — Mr. William Jenkins
Lawrence Hilton Jacobs — Theopolis Parker
Joan Pringle — Adele Eloise Parker
Dorian Gibbs — Bobby Parker
Taurean Blacque — Blue Haven
Stephanie E. Williams — Young Girl

The Balzer Theater at Herren's, Atlanta, True Colors Theatre Company, July 8 - August 19, 2007. Directed by Kenny Leon with the following cast:

Glynn Turman — Mr. Russell B. Parker
Eugene Lee — Mr. William Jenkins
Brandon J. Dirden — Theopolis Parker
Karan Kendrick — Adele Eloise Parker
Jason Dirden — Bobby Parker
E. Roger Mitchell — Blue Haven
Cara Patterson — Young Girl

Ceremonies in Dark Old Men was made into a television movie in 1975, the cast included: Douglas Turner Ward, Rosalind Cash,  Robert Hooks, and Glynn Turman. L.A. Theatre Works included it as a part of their 2008–2009 season, it featured actors Glynn Turman, Charlie Robinson, and Rocky Carroll. Other productions of the play have featured many prominent actors, including Denzel Washington, Billy Dee Williams, Keith David, and Laurence Fishburne.

References

External links
The Sound of Applause: Pat's in The Flats, 'Ceremonies in Dark Old Men' & 'Intergalactic Nemesis' Thursday, January 30, 2014 
Ceremonies in Dark Old Men L.A. Theatre Works, Directed by Judyann Elder, Jan 16, 2009
Ceremonies in Dark Old Men at the Lortel Archives - The Internet Off-Broadway Database

1969 plays
Off-Broadway plays
American plays adapted into films
Plays about race and ethnicity
Harlem in fiction
Plays set in New York City
African-American plays